The 1976 Washington gubernatorial election was held on November 2, 1976. This election was especially significant in that Washington elected its first female governor, Dixy Lee Ray. Wesley C. Uhlman and John Patric unsuccessfully ran in the blanket primary.

General election

Candidates
Dixy Lee Ray (D), former Assistant Secretary of State for Oceans and International Environmental and Scientific Affairs
John Spellman (R), King County Executive

Results

References

1976
1976 United States gubernatorial elections
Gubernatorial
November 1976 events in the United States